Luiz Imparato (1 May 1910 – 8 March 1976) was a Brazilian footballer.

Honours
Palmeiras
Campeonato Paulista: 1932, 1933, 1934, 1936

References

1910 births
1976 deaths
Footballers from São Paulo
Brazilian footballers
Association football forwards
Campeonato Brasileiro Série A players
Esporte Clube São Bento players
Sociedade Esportiva Palmeiras players